Rukirabasaija Kasunga Kyebambe Nyaika was Omukama of the Kingdom of Tooro, from 1862 -1863, and 1864 -1874. He was the third (3rd) Omukama of Toro.

Claim to the throne
He was the fourth (4th) son of Rukirabasaija Kaboyo Omuhundwa Kasusunkwanzi Olimi I, the first Omukama of Toro, who reigned between 1830 and 1861. There is no mention of who his mother was. He killed his elder brother Rukirabasaija Kazana Ruhaga, in 1862, and ascended the throne by force.

Married life
Not much is written about the married life of Omukama Kyebambe Nyaika.

Offspring
Omukama Nyaika is said to have fathered fourteen (14) sons, including the following:

 Rukirabasaija Nyaika Mukabirere Olimi II, Omukama of Toro, who reigned between 1874 and 1876.
 Prince (Omubiito) Mukarusa. He rebelled against his brother Nyaika Olimi II and seized Busongora in 1872. He was proclaimed Omukama under the title of Rukirabasaija Mukarusa Kyebambe II. He was defeated and killed in 1875, by the Bunyoro Army commanded by Chief Kikukule of Bugangaizi.
 Rukirabasaija Isingoma Rukidi II, Omukama of Toro, who reigned in 1875.
 Rukirabasaija Kakende Nyamuyonjo, Omukama of Toro, who reigned from 1875 until 1876 and from 1879 until 1880.
 Rukirabasaija Katera, Omukama of Toro, who reigned between 1876 and 1877.
7. Rukirabasaijja Daudi Kasagama Kyebambe lV

His reign
He was forced to flee when the Kingdom of Toro was invaded by an army from Buganda, in support of Kato Rukidi I, who rebelled against his uncle (Nyaika), briefly seized the throne and declared himself Omukama. After a few months, Kato Rukidi I was overthrown by his subjects and Omukama Nyaika returned to the throne.

The final years
Omukama Nyaika died in 1872.

Succession table:First time

Succession table:Second time

See also
 Omukama of Toro

References

Toro
19th-century rulers in Africa
1872 deaths
Year of birth unknown